Limulus clotting enzyme (clotting enzyme) is an enzyme. This enzyme catalyses the following chemical reaction

 Selective cleavage of -Arg18- and -Arg47- bonds in coagulogen to form coagulin and fragments

This enzyme is present in the hemocyte granules of horseshoe crabs Limulus and Tachypleus. In the immunity-related clotting pathways of these organisms, it is the final enzyme responsible for the activation of coagulin.

References

External links 
 

EC 3.4.21